The Green Bay Road Bridge is a Pratt pony truss bridge across the Manitowoc River in Manitowoc Rapids. The  bridge was built in 1887 by the Wisconsin Bridge and Iron Company and was the second river crossing built at its location. Originally a road bridge, the bridge is now used for a bicycle and walking trail; it is in good condition and is considered a historically significant example of a pony truss road bridge. The bridge was added to the National Register of Historic Places on August 3, 1998.

References

Road bridges on the National Register of Historic Places in Wisconsin
Bridges completed in 1887
Buildings and structures in Manitowoc County, Wisconsin
National Register of Historic Places in Manitowoc County, Wisconsin
Pratt truss bridges in the United States
Metal bridges in the United States